The East Lancs Flyte is a type of single-decker bus body built on several different chassis rebodied and original types by East Lancashire Coachbuilders as the replacement for the East Lancs EL2000 from 1996 to 2001.

Chassis
Chassis types on which the Flyte was built include:
 Scania L113CRL
 Scania K112CRB and Scania K113CRB (rebodies)
 Volvo B6 (rebody) (photo)
 Leyland Tiger (rebodies)
 Volvo B10M (new and rebodies)
 KIRN Mogul (unique chassis, bodied for Yorkshire Traction)

History
The Flyte was introduced in 1996 as a step-entrance counterpart to the Spryte. It was essentially a development of the Opus 2 design which had appeared earlier the same year. The Flyte had a new front end design based on the Spryte (though two Volvo B10Ms for Delaine Buses had the Opus 2 front end).

A large proportion of the Flyte's orders were for the rebodying of older chassis and this model has a double-curvature windscreen with a roof dome. In the severely dwindling market for step-entrance rebodies, the Flyte was superseded by the East Lancs Myllennium-based Hyline around 2000–2001.

Competitors (bodywork)
 Alexander Dash
 Duple Dartline
 East Lancs EL2000
 Marshall C37
 Northern Counties Paladin

See also 

 List of buses

References

External links 

Flyte
Vehicles introduced in 1996
Buses of the United Kingdom
Full-size buses
Midibuses
Step-entrance buses